Ellen Jansen (born 6 October 1992) is a Dutch professional footballer who plays as a forward for Spanish Primera División club Valencia CF and the Netherlands women's national team.

International career
On 12 December 2010, she made her debut for the Dutch national team, in the 2010 International Women's Football Tournament of City of São Paulo match against Brazil.

International goals
Scores and results list the Netherlands goal tally first.

Honours

Club
FC Twente
 Eredivisie (2): 2010–11, 2015–16
 BeNe League (2): 2012–13, 2013–14
 KNVB Women's Cup (1): 2014–15

International
Netherlands
Algarve Cup: 2018

References

External links
 Profile  at Onsoranje.nl
 Profile at onsoranje.nl 
 

1992 births
Living people
Dutch women's footballers
Netherlands women's international footballers
Eredivisie (women) players
FC Twente (women) players
AFC Ajax (women) players
People from Hof van Twente
Women's association football forwards
2019 FIFA Women's World Cup players
Dutch expatriate sportspeople in Spain
Expatriate women's footballers in Spain
Dutch expatriate women's footballers
Footballers from Overijssel